There are at least 14 named lakes and reservoirs in Richland County, Montana.

Lakes
 Burns Lake, el. 
 Fox Lake, el.

Reservoirs
 Candee Pond, el. 
 Erickson Reservoir, el. 
 Factory Lake, el. 
 Fatzinger Reservoir, el. 
 Gartside Lake, el. 
 Gartside Reservoir, el. 
 Kuester Lake, el. 
 Latka Reservoir, el. 
 McGlynn Reservoir, el. 
 Prevost Reservoir Number 2, el. 
 Vaux Reservoir Number One, el. 
 Vaux Reservoir Number Two, el.

See also
 List of lakes in Montana

Notes

Bodies of water of Richland County, Montana
Richland